Galaga: Destination Earth, known in the Game Boy Color version as Galaga, is a 2000 3D video game, an update to the popular Golden Age arcade game, Galaga. It was developed by King of the Jungle and published by Hasbro Interactive and Majesco Entertainment for Microsoft Windows, PlayStation, and Game Boy Color.

Destination Earth includes nine stages, each consisting of several "waves" of alien attackers and bonus waves. Most of the stages are planetary locations, like an Ancient Egyptianish Mars, Metropolitan Earth, and Saturn. Some are non-planet astronomical objects like the moon or the sun. On the final stage, the player finds must battle on a "planetoid". The "waves" consist of three preset views denoted as ALPHA (1st person), DELTA (side scroller), and GAMMA (top view or original Galaga view).

If a tractor beam ship is destroyed, there is a chance that a cube will come out. If the player catches this cube, they will get a temporary tractor beam that can capture an enemy ship. Captured enemy ships will then act as wing-men for your fighter until destroyed by enemy fire, just as they do in Gaplus.

Reception

The Windows and PlayStation versions received "mixed" reviews according to the review aggregation website Metacritic. Jeff Lundrigan of NextGen said of the latter version, "Despite the nostalgia factor, this seems to be aimed at the mass market, not the hardcore. As such, it's relatively simple and not that thrilling."

Notes

References

External links
 
 
 Galaga: Destination Earth can be played for free in the browser on the Internet Archive

2000 video games
Galaxian
Game Boy Color games
Hasbro games
Majesco Entertainment games
Pipe Dream Interactive games
PlayStation (console) games
Single-player video games
Video games developed in the United Kingdom
Windows games
King of the Jungle games